The Alchemist is an album composed by John Zorn and featuring two new compositions, one for string quartet and another for female voices, recorded in New York City in 2013 and released on the Tzadik label in February 2014.

Track listing
All compositions by John Zorn
 "The Alchemist" – 20:08   
 "Earthspirit" – 12:56

Personnel
Jesse Mills, Pauline Kim – violin (track 1)
David Fulmer – viola (track 1)
Jay Campbell – cello (track 1)
Jane Sheldon, Kirsten Sollek, Mellissa Hughes – vocals (track 2)

Production
Marc Uselli – engineer, audio mixer
John Zorn and Kazunori Sugiyama – producers

References
 

2014 albums
John Zorn albums
Albums produced by John Zorn
Tzadik Records albums